Tyrotama is a genus of African tree trunk spiders that was first described by S. H. Foord & A. S. Dippenaar-Schoeman in 2005.

Species
 it contains eight species:
Tyrotama abyssus Foord & Dippenaar-Schoeman, 2005 – South Africa
Tyrotama arida (Smithers, 1945) (type) – South Africa
Tyrotama australis (Simon, 1893) – South Africa, Lesotho
Tyrotama bicava (Smithers, 1945) – Namibia
Tyrotama fragilis (Lawrence, 1928) – Angola, Namibia
Tyrotama incerta (Tucker, 1920) – South Africa
Tyrotama soutpansbergensis Foord & Dippenaar-Schoeman, 2005 – South Africa
Tyrotama taris Foord & Dippenaar-Schoeman, 2005 – South Africa

References

Araneomorphae genera
Hersiliidae
Spiders of Africa